Bonnie Jean Dorr is an American computer scientist specializing in natural language processing and machine translation. She is a professor emerita of computer science and linguistics at the University of Maryland, College Park, an associate director and senior research scientist at the Florida Institute for Human and Machine Cognition, and the former president of the Association for Computational Linguistics.

Education and career
Dorr is a graduate of Boston University, and earned a Ph.D. in 1990 from the Massachusetts Institute of Technology. Her dissertation, Lexical Conceptual Structure and Machine Translation, was supervised by Robert C. Berwick.

Dorr joined the University of Maryland faculty in 1992. At Maryland, she became the founding co-director of the Computational Linguistics and Information Processing Laboratory, and associate dean of the university's College of Computer Math and Natural Sciences. She has also worked as a program director at DARPA beginning in 2011 while on leave from Maryland. She joined the Florida Institute for Human and Machine Cognition in 2014.

Book
Dorr is the author of Machine Translation: A View from the Lexicon (MIT Press, 1993), a revision of her doctoral dissertation. It describes an approach to interlingual machine translation in which, rather than directly translating text from one language to another, it goes through an intermediate form represented using conceptual semantics. The translations between the syntax of each natural language handled by the system and this form are made using government and binding theory, in contrast to the more typical approach from that time which performed this sort of translation using phrase structure grammars and the unification of feature structures. Her system was embodied in the UNITRAN system, and translated between English, Spanish, and German. However, her work was criticized for its lack of completeness (inability to handle certain common grammatical structures in these languages). Subsequently to Dorr's work, rule-based machine translation systems such as hers that embody a deep hand-coded knowledge of each of the languages they translate have largely been supplanted by statistical machine translation and neural machine translation, and some of Dorr's own highly-cited later work instead focuses on data-driven approaches to machine translation.

Recognition
Dorr was president of the Association for Computational Linguistics for 2008. She has been a Sloan Research Fellow and National Science Foundation Presidential Faculty Fellow. She was elected as a Fellow of the Association for the Advancement of Artificial Intelligence in 2013 for "significant contributions to natural language understanding and representation, and development of the widely recognized methods for interlingual machine translation". In 2016 she was elected as a Fellow of the Association for Computational Linguistics.

References

External links

Year of birth missing (living people)
Living people
American computer scientists
American women computer scientists
Boston University alumni
Massachusetts Institute of Technology alumni
University of Maryland, College Park faculty
Fellows of the Association for the Advancement of Artificial Intelligence
Fellows of the Association for Computational Linguistics
Natural language processing researchers
21st-century American women
Recipients of the Presidential Early Career Award for Scientists and Engineers
Presidents of the Association for Computational Linguistics